Fløan Church (Fløan kirke) was a medieval church that stood in the village of Fløan in the Skatval area of present-day Stjørdal municipality in Trøndelag county, Norway. Materials from Fløan church are displayed at the Trøndelag Folkemuseum at Sverresborg in Trondheim.

History
The first written record of the church is in the Aslak Bolts jordebok. In 1432 Aslak Bolt, Bishop of the Archdiocese of Nidaros, commissioned this land register which listed lands, estates, and revenues associated with the diocese. The church was closed after the Reformation and finally completely demolished in 1851.

The church has been carbon dated to 1420. Other medieval history indicates that for some time before the current building existed there stood another church at the same location.

References

External links
Trøndelag Folkemuseum official website
Aslak Bolt (1428–1450)
Aslak Bolts bibel

Stjørdal
Churches in Trøndelag
15th-century churches in Norway
Demolished buildings and structures in Norway
Buildings and structures demolished in 1851
Former churches in Norway